Golden Gully is a town in northern Victoria, Australia.  The town is located in the City of Greater Bendigo.

Demographics
The median age of persons in Golden Gully was 41 years. There were more males than females, with 52.9% of the population male and 47.1% female. The average household size was 2.6 people per household.

References

Towns in Victoria (Australia)
Bendigo